The 2005 Baseball World Cup (BWC) was the 36th international Men's amateur baseball tournament. The tournament was sanctioned by the International Baseball Federation, which titled it the Amateur World Series from the 1938 tournament through the 1986 AWS. The tournament was held, for the second time, in the Netherlands, from September 2 to 17. Cuba defeated South Korea in the final, winning its 25th title.

There were 18 participating countries, split into two groups, with the first four of each group qualifying for the finals. Games were played in the Dutch cities of Rotterdam, Haarlem, Almere, Amsterdam and Eindhoven.

The next three competitions were also held as the BWC tournament, which was replaced in 2015 by the quadrennial WBSC Premier12.

First round

Pool A

Standings

Schedule and results

Pool B

Standings

Schedule and results

Playoffs

Quarter-finals

5th–8th place

Semi-finals

7th place game

5th place game

Bronze medal game

Final

Final standings

Awards

References

External links
XXXVI Baseball World Cup - XXXVI Copa del Mundo de Béisbol
World Cup Baseball 2005
XXXVI World Cup Baseball 2 - 17 September 2005, Netherlands

Baseball World Cup
2005
2005 in baseball
2005 in Dutch sport
September 2005 sports events in Europe
Sports competitions in Almere
Baseball World Cup, 2005
Sports competitions in Eindhoven
Sports competitions in Haarlem
Sports competitions in Rotterdam
2000s in Amsterdam
21st century in Eindhoven
21st century in Rotterdam